Tsaghkunk or Tsaghkunk’ or Tsakhkunk or Tzaghkunk or Tsaghkunq may refer to:
Tsaghkunk, Armavir, Armenia
Tsaghkunk, Gegharkunik, Armenia